Charlie Nguyen, Vietnamese name is Nguyen Chanh Truc (born September 25, 1968), is Vietnamese–American film director, screenwriter and producer.

He is the older brother of actor Johnny Tri Nguyen, he and Johnny with comedian Van Son are nephews of actor Nguyen Chanh Tin.

Biography 

In 1992, Nguyen started his own production company called Cinema Pictures in California, which was later evolved into Chanh Phuong Films in 2004 in Vietnam. His film credits include  Hung Vuong the 18th/Thời Hùng Vương 18 (1994, writer/director), Chances Are/Vật Đổi Sao Dời (2002, writer/director), Finding Madison (2005, co-producer), Fool For Love/Để Mai Tính (2009, director), the award-winning hit release by The Weinstein Company, The Rebel/Dòng Máu Anh Hùng (2006, co-writer/co-producer/director), The Prince and the Pagoda Boy/Khát Vọng Thăng Long (2010, writer), the Vietnam box office record comedy - Big Boss/Long Ruồi (2011, director), Love Puzzles/Cưới Ngay Kẻo lỡ (2012, writer/director), Little Teo/Tèo Em (2013, writer/director), Vietnam banned martial arts gangster - Cho Lon/Bụi Đời Chợ Lớn (2013, writer/director), Vampire Diary (2014, additional action director), Fool For Love 2/Để Mai Tính 2 (2014, director/co-writer) and Crouching Tiger Hidden Dragon 2 (2015, producer), Fanatic/Fan Cuồng (2016, writer/director), Jailbait/Em Chưa 18 (2017, producer/co-writer), Daddy Issues/Hồn Papa, Da Con Gái (2018, producer), My Mr. Wife/Chàng Vợ Của Em (2018, co-writer/director)and What We Forgot to Remember/Người Cần Quên Phải Nhớ (2020, producer/story by). He's currently in development of several feature films, mini series and directing commercials in Saigon.

Filmography

Personal life
Nguyen is married to Diane Nguyen and father to the U.S. national karate champion, Jasmine Nguyen. He is the brother of actor Johnny Trí Nguyễn.

References

External links

Living people
People from Ho Chi Minh City
Vietnamese film directors
American people of Vietnamese descent
1968 births